The 2007–08 Ukrainian Hockey League season was the 15th season of the Ukrainian Hockey League, the top level of ice hockey in Ukraine. Six teams participated in the league, and HC Sokil Kyiv II won the championship.

Regular season

Playoffs
Semifinals
Bilyi Bars Brovary - HK Kompanion Kyiv 2-0 on series
HC Sokil Kyiv II - HC Kharkiv 2-0 on series
Final
HC Sokil Kyiv II - Bilyi Bars Brovary 2-0 on series
3rd place
HC Kharkiv - HK Kompanion Kyiv 2-1 on series

External links
Ukrainian Ice Hockey Federation

UKHL
Ukrainian Hockey Championship seasons
Ukr